Ronald Hunt (5 April 1929 – 29 October 2016) was an Australian wrestler. He competed in two events at the 1960 Summer Olympics.

References

External links
 

1929 births
2016 deaths
Australian male sport wrestlers
Olympic wrestlers of Australia
Wrestlers at the 1960 Summer Olympics
Sportspeople from Albury
Sportsmen from New South Wales